WSWF-LD, virtual channel 10 (UHF digital channel 29), is a low-powered Diya TV-affiliated television station licensed to Orlando, Florida. The station is owned by Major Market Broadcasting.

History 
The station’s construction permit was initially a digital companion channel issued on March 19, 1997 under the calls of W19AX, and changed to W13CU. On June 6, 2000, it was reassigned the callsign WSWF-LP. On November 17, 2009, it moved to the current callsign WSWF-LD.

Digital channels
The station's digital signal is multiplexed:

Major Market Broadcasting stations
KAAP-LD - San Jose, California
KNDB - Bismarck, North Dakota
KNDM - Minot, North Dakota
KRDK-TV - Fargo, North Dakota
WRJK-LD - Chicago, Illinois
WSWF-LD - Orlando, Florida

References

External links

Low-power television stations in the United States
SWF-LD
Television channels and stations established in 1997
1997 establishments in Florida
Diya TV affiliates
Local Now affiliates
NewsNet affiliates
Antenna TV affiliates